Antone Charles "Tony" Costa (August 2, 1944 – May 12, 1974), was an American serial killer who achieved notoriety for committing serial murders in and around the town of Truro, Massachusetts, in 1969.

Early life and crimes
Antone Charles Costa was born on August 2, 1944, in Cambridge, Massachusetts. He committed his first violent offense in November 1961, at age 17, when he broke into a house and attacked an occupant, a teenaged girl. Charged with burglary and assault, Costa was sentenced to three years' probation and a one-year suspended sentence.

In 1966, Costa picked up two hitchhikers, Bonnie Williams and Diane Federoff, and promised to take them to Pennsylvania. The women disappeared shortly after their encounter with Costa, who told investigators that he had dropped them off in California. Costa was additionally thought to have murdered his girlfriend, Barbara Spaulding, while he was living in California in 1967. However, all three women were later found alive.

1969 murders
Costa was suspected of killing eight women: Diane Federoff, Bonnie Williams, Barbara Spaulding, Sydney Monzon, Susan Perry, Christine Gallant, Patricia Walsh, and Mary Anne Wysocki but convicted of killing only two: Walsh and Wysocki. Although suspected of killing Federoff, Williams and Spaulding, those women were later found alive.

On February 8, 1969, while looking for the bodies of Patricia Walsh and Mary Anne Wysocki, police discovered Susan Perry. Perry had been missing since the previous Labor Day.

Perry's body had been cut into eight pieces. When Wysocki's body was found about a month later, her torso and head had been buried separately. Not long after, Walsh and the rest of Wysocki's body were found in a forest clearing that Costa had used for growing marijuana. This "garden" of marijuana plants and the greater case inspired the true crime book In His Garden, by Leo Damore.

The case gained international attention when district attorney Edmund Dinis, in comments to the media, claimed of Walsh and Wysocki, "The hearts of each girl had been removed from the bodies and were not in the graves…Each body was cut into as many parts as there are joints." Dinis also claimed that there were teeth marks found on the bodies. These claims, although untrue, produced a stream of national and international media outlets into local Provincetown, Massachusetts.

The media attention was so great that Kurt Vonnegut (whose daughter Edith had met Costa) compared him to Jack the Ripper in an article in the July 25, 1969 issue of Life Magazine, which was included in his collection of essays Wampeters, Foma and Granfalloons. Vonnegut maintained a correspondence with Costa. The author said, "The message of his letters to me was that a person as intent on being virtuous as he could not possibly have hurt a fly. He believed it."

Costa's account
Costa described the murders of Walsh and Wysocki in his unpublished novel, Resurrection, written while he was in prison. In his account, Costa and a friend named "Cory" were out with the two women consuming LSD and Dilaudid. Cory then shot Walsh and Wysocki. Costa claimed he was able to subdue his friend and upon realizing that Mary Anne Wysocki was still alive used a knife to end her suffering. According to Costa, he and Cory buried the bodies.

The novel also describes the deaths of Susan Perry and Sydney Monzon as due to drug overdoses. Costa claims it was "Carl", his alter-ego, who dismembered and buried their bodies and that he had no knowledge until after their deaths.

Trial and imprisonment
On June 12, 1969, Costa was arraigned on charges of murder for three of the deaths. In May 1970, he was convicted of the murders of Mary Anne Wysocki and Patricia Walsh and sentenced to life in prison at Massachusetts' Walpole Correctional Institution. Four years after his incarceration, Costa committed suicide by hanging himself in his cell. In later years, his suicide was questioned as a possible murder.

In popular culture
The case was covered by the popular true-crime show Born to Kill? in season six. The episode aired on television in 2014.

In 2021, Liza Rodman wrote a book about her encounter with Costa during her childhood. He was her babysitter during summer break before the murders.

See also 
 List of serial killers in the United States

References

1944 births
1974 suicides
1969 murders in the United States
20th-century American criminals
American male criminals
American people convicted of murder
American prisoners sentenced to life imprisonment
American serial killers
Criminals from Massachusetts
Male serial killers
People convicted of murder by Massachusetts
People from Provincetown, Massachusetts
Prisoners sentenced to life imprisonment by Massachusetts
Prisoners who died in Massachusetts detention
Serial killers who committed suicide in prison custody
Suicides by hanging in Massachusetts